Kowr may refer to:
 Kowr-e Pain, East Azerbaijan Province

See also
 Kur, Iran